Austad may refer to:

People
Alf Magne Austad (1946–2013), a Norwegian painter
Mark Evans Austad (1917–1988), was an American radio and television commentator
Steven N. Austad, a biology professor at the University of Alabama at Birmingham
Tore Austad (born 1935), a Norwegian politician for the Conservative Party

Places
Austad, Bygland, a village in Bygland municipality in Agder county, Norway
Austad, Drammen, a borough in the town of Drammen in Viken county, Norway
Austad, Lyngdal, a village in Lyngdal municipality in Agder county, Norway
Austad (municipality), a former municipality in Agder county, Norway
Austad, Vestfold og Telemark, a village in Siljan municipality in Vestfold og Telemark county, Norway
Austad Church (Bygland), a church in Bygland municipality in Agder county, Norway
Austad Church (Lyngdal), a church in Lyngdal municipality in Agder county, Norway